ILAS, ilas or variant, may refer to:

 International Linear Algebra Society
 Ilas, a barrio in Dao, Capiz, Philippines, composed of Ilas Sur and Ilas Norte
 ILAS Air (ICAO airline code: ILC), see List of airline codes (I)

See also

 
 
 
 ila (disambiguation)
 isla (disambiguation)